Héctor Urbina (born September 17, 1987) is a Mexican-American mixed martial artist. A professional since 2006 who last competed in 2018, he has fought in the UFC, Bellator, EliteXC, and King of the Cage.

Mixed martial arts career

Early career
After compiling a 2-0 record as an amateur, Urbina made his professional MMA debut in September 2006. Over the first two years of his career, he amassed a record of 12-4 and fought for a number of promotions including King of the Cage, Elite XC, Icon Sport, and Extreme Challenge.

Bellator Fighting Championships
Urbina fought in the earliest years of Bellator Fighting Championships. He faced future champion Lyman Good on the organization's second event, Bellator 2, in April 2009 and lost by technical submission. He then faced Ira Boyd at Bellator 6 in May 2009 and won by TKO in the first round.

Ultimate Fighting Championship
After returning to the independent MMA scene where he amassed a record of 3 wins, 3 losses and 1 draw over the next five years, Urbina was signed by the Ultimate Fighting Championship. He made his debut at UFC 180 against Edgar Garcia on November 15, 2014. Despite being a significant underdog, Urbina defeated Garcia by submission in the first round.

Urbina was next scheduled to face Albert Tumenov at UFC 188. However, he pulled out of the bout due to an arm injury.

Urbrina returned to the Octagon against Bartosz Fabiński at The Ultimate Fighter Latin America 2 Finale on November 21, 2015. He lost the bout by unanimous decision.

Urbina was then scheduled to face George Sullivan at UFC on FOX 20. However, this bout was cancelled due to a USADA violation by Sullivan.

Urbina next faced Vicente Luque at UFC Fight Night: Cyborg vs. Länsberg on September 24, 2016. He lost the fight via knockout in the first round.

The Ultimate Fighter: Redemption
After a 1-2 run in the UFC, Urbina was announced as one of the fighters for The Ultimate Fighter: Redemption in February 2017. On the first episode, Urbina was picked fourth by Cody Garbrandt to be on his team. He was scheduled to face James Krause in the show's first fight. However, after two days of cutting weight, Urbina was unable to make the welterweight limit of 171 pounds, only getting down to 188.4 pounds. Ultimately, Urbina was removed from the bout and show and replaced by Johnny Nunez.

Mixed martial arts record

|-
|Loss
|align=center|17-11-1
|Dequan Townsend
|KO (head kick)
|New League Fights 7: Hallows Eve
|
|align=center|1
|align=center|1:16
|Montpelier, Ohio, United States
|Middleweight bout.
|-
|Loss
|align=center|17–10–1 
|Vicente Luque
|KO (punch)
|UFC Fight Night: Cyborg vs. Länsberg
|
|align=center|1
|align=center|1:00
|Brasília, Brazil
|
|-
|Loss
|align=center|17–9–1
|Bartosz Fabiński
|Decision (unanimous)
|The Ultimate Fighter Latin America 2 Finale: Magny vs. Gastelum
|
|align=center|3
|align=center|5:00
|Monterrey, Mexico
|  
|-
| Win
| align=center| 17–8–1
| Edgar Garcia
| Submission (guillotine choke)
| UFC 180
| 
| align=center| 1
| align=center| 3:38
| Mexico City, Mexico
| 
|-
| Win
| align=center| 16–8–1
| Nick Duell
| TKO (punches)
| NAAFS: Fight Night in the Flats 9
| 
| align=center| 3
| align=center| 3:35
| Cleveland, Ohio, United States
|Return to Welterweight; won the NAAFS Welterweight Championship.
|-
| Loss
| align=center| 15–8–1
| Tyler Beckley
| TKO (doctor stoppage)
| Purgatory FS 10: Purgatory Fight Series 10
| 
| align=center| 1
| align=center| 1:32
| Toledo, Ohio, United States
| 
|-
| Loss
| align=center| 15–7–1
| Nissen Osterneck
| Decision (split)
| Warfare 6: Friday Night Fights
| 
| align=center| 3
| align=center| 5:00
| Myrtle Beach, South Carolina, United States
| 
|-
| Win
| align=center| 15–6–1
| Travis Clark
| Submission (guillotine choke)
| NAAFS: Caged Fury 17
| 
| align=center| 1
| align=center| 0:16
| Morgantown, West Virginia, United States
|Won the NAAFS Middleweight Championship.
|-
| Draw
| align=center| 14–6–1
| Tomar Washington
| Technical Draw (illegal elbows from Washington)
| Warfare 4: Fight Night at the Palace
| 
| align=center| 1
| align=center| 0:00
| Myrtle Beach, South Carolina, United States
| 
|-
| Win
| align=center| 14–6
| William Hill
| TKO (punches)
| AFA 6: Uprising
| 
| align=center| 1
| align=center| 3:20
| Fort Wayne, Indiana, United States
| 
|-
| Loss
| align=center| 13–6
| Brendan Seguin
| TKO (punches)
| IFL: The Saint Valentine's Day Massacre
| 
| align=center| 1
| align=center| 3:51
| Auburn Hills, Michigan, United States
|Return to Middleweight.
|-
| Win
| align=center| 13–5
| Ira Boyd
| TKO (arm injury)
| Bellator 6
| 
| align=center| 1
| align=center| 0:19
| Robstown, Texas, United States
|
|-
| Loss
| align=center| 12–5
| Lyman Good
| Technical Submission (rear-naked choke)
| Bellator 2
| 
| align=center| 2
| align=center| 3:22
| Uncasville, Connecticut, United States
| 
|-
| Win
| align=center| 12–4
| David Kleczkowski
| TKO (punches)
| AMMA 1: Adrenaline MMA 1
| 
| align=center| 2
| align=center| 1:19
| Chicago, Illinois, United States
| 
|-
| Loss
| align=center| 11–4
| Fernando Gonzalez
| Submission (guillotine choke)
| KOTC: Fight Nite at the Shrine
| 
| align=center| 1
| align=center| 2:10
| Los Angeles, California, United States
| 
|-
| Win
| align=center| 11–3
| Herbert Goodman
| Decision (unanimous)
| KOTC: Sub Zero
| 
| align=center| 3
| align=center| 3:00
| Lac du Flambeau, Wisconsin, United States
|
|-
| Win
| align=center| 10–3
| Joe Kennedy
| KO (punches)
| KOTC: Damage Inc.
| 
| align=center| 1
| align=center| 2:24
| Rockford, Illinois, United States
| 
|-
| Win
| align=center| 9–3
| Ray Lizama
| Decision (unanimous)
| ShoXC: Elite Challenger Series
| 
| align=center| 3
| align=center| 5:00
| Vicksburg, Mississippi, United States
|Middleweight bout.
|-
| Win
| align=center| 8–3
| Adrian Serrano
| KO (punches)
| KOTC: Damage Control
| 
| align=center| 1
| align=center| 1:18
| Chicago, Illinois, United States
|Return to Welterweight.
|-
| Loss
| align=center| 7–3
| Jason Miller
| TKO (punches)
| Icon Sport: Epic
| 
| align=center| 1
| align=center| 1:11
| Honolulu, Hawaii, United States
| 
|-
| Win
| align=center| 7–2
| John Doyle
| Submission (choke)
| EC 74: Extreme Challenge 74
| 
| align=center| 0
| align=center| 0:00
| Iowa City, Iowa, United States
| 
|-
| Win
| align=center| 6–2
| Jason Louck
| N/A
| EC 74: Extreme Challenge 74
| 
| align=center| N/A
| align=center| N/A
| Iowa City, Iowa, United States
| 
|-
| Loss
| align=center| 5–2
| Adam Maciejewski
| TKO (punches)
| KOTC: Hard Knocks
| 
| align=center| 1
| align=center| 2:50
| Rockford, Illinois, United States
|Heavyweight bout.
|-
| Win
| align=center| 5–1
| Eli Moreno
| TKO (punches)
| FCFS 5: Full Contact Fight Series 5
| 
| align=center| 1
| align=center| 0:42
| Fort Wayne, Indiana, United States
| 
|-
| Win
| align=center| 4–1
| Cedric James
| Submission (rear-naked choke)
| FOG: Fists of Glory
| 
| align=center| 1
| align=center| 1:01
| Richmond, Indiana, United States
| 
|-
| Win
| align=center| 3–1
| Rudy Rosales
| TKO (punches)
| FCFS 4: Damage Control
| 
| align=center| 1
| align=center| 1:32
| Auburn, Indiana, United States
| 
|-
| Loss
| align=center| 2–1
| Tim Kennedy
| KO (punches)
| FF 7: Fightfest 7
| 
| align=center| 1
| align=center| 1:51
| Cleveland, Ohio, United States
| 
|-
| Win
| align=center| 2–0
| Shane Lightle
| TKO (punches)
| FCFS 3: Full Contact Fight Series
| 
| align=center| 1
| align=center| 3:13
| Auburn, Indiana, United States
| 
|-
| Win
| align=center| 1–0
| Brian Brannon
| Submission (rear-naked choke)
| HHCF 27: Rumble at the Rodeo 2
| 
| align=center| 1
| align=center| 1:16
| Chillicothe, Ohio, United States
|

Mixed martial arts amateur record

|-
| Win
| align=center| 2–0
| Travis Stout
| TKO
| NLF 5: Next Level Fighting 5
| 
| align=center| 1
| align=center| 0:48
| Steubenville, Ohio, United States
| 
|-
| Win
| align=center| 1–0
| Jeremy Shimae
| Submission (strikes)
| UFS 2: Ultimate Fight Series 2
| 
| align=center| 1
| align=center| 1:52
| Auburn, Indiana, United States
|

See also
List of male mixed martial artists

References

External links
 
 
 
 
 Héctor Urbina at MMAjunkie.com
 UFC 180: Hunt vs Werdum results - Ricardo Lamas, Hector Urbina, Augusto Montano pick up victories at BloodyElbow.com
 UFC 180 live blog: Edgar Garcia vs. Hector Urbina at MMAfighting.com
 UFC 180 fight card: Edgar Garcia vs Hector Urbina fight preview at MMAmania.com
 UFC 180 results: Hector Urbina submits Edgar Garcia at MMAmania.com
 

1987 births
American male mixed martial artists
Welterweight mixed martial artists
Middleweight mixed martial artists
Light heavyweight mixed martial artists
Living people
People from Coconut Creek, Florida
Ultimate Fighting Championship male fighters
Sportspeople from Chicago
Mixed martial artists from Illinois